The 1941 Spring Hill Badgers football team was an American football team that represented Spring Hill College as a member of the Dixie Conference during the 1940 college football season. In their third year under head coach Earle Smith, the team compiled a 2–6 record. This marked the final season for Spring Hill football as the College elected to abandon the program in January 1942.

Schedule

References

Spring Hill
Spring Hill Badgers football seasons
Spring Hill Badgers football